Azerbaijan fielded one competitor at the 2009 World Championships in Athletics in Berlin.

Team selection
Track and road events

Results

Men

References

External links
Official competition website

Nations at the 2009 World Championships in Athletics
World Championships in Athletics
2009